Hjalmar Eemil Nyström (28 March 1904 – 6 December 1960) was a Finnish heavyweight wrestler who competed at the 1924, 1928 and 1936 Olympics. He placed tenth in freestyle wrestling in 1924 and won a silver medal in Greco-Roman wrestling in 1928. At the 1936 Olympics he won a freestyle bronze and finished fifth in the Greco-Roman contest. At the European championships he won three silver medals in Greco-Roman wrestling in 1930, 1931 and 1935 and a freestyle bronze in 1934. Domestically, Nyström won ten titles, all in Greco-Roman wrestling, in 1924, 1926–28, 1930–31, 1935–37 and 1939. Nyström worked as a steam locomotive fireman and later as a train driver.

References

External links
 

1904 births
1960 deaths
Olympic wrestlers of Finland
Wrestlers at the 1924 Summer Olympics
Wrestlers at the 1928 Summer Olympics
Wrestlers at the 1936 Summer Olympics
Finnish male sport wrestlers
Olympic silver medalists for Finland
Olympic bronze medalists for Finland
Swedish-speaking Finns
Olympic medalists in wrestling
Medalists at the 1928 Summer Olympics
Medalists at the 1936 Summer Olympics
European Wrestling Championships medalists
Sportspeople from Helsinki
20th-century Finnish people